Joseba Zaldúa Bengoetxea (born 24 June 1992) is a Spanish professional footballer who plays as a right-back for Cádiz CF.

Club career

Real Sociedad
Born in San Sebastián, Gipuzkoa, Zaldúa played his youth football with local Real Sociedad. He made his senior debut with the reserves, spending several seasons in the Segunda División B with them.

Zaldúa appeared in his first official match with the main squad on 23 November 2013, featuring the first 80 minutes before being substituted for Javi Ros in a 4–3 La Liga home win against RC Celta de Vigo. Roughly a month later, he signed a new deal with the Basques until 2016.

On 20 May 2014, Zaldúa renewed his contract with the Txuri-urdin until 2018, and was definitely promoted to the first team. On 4 July 2017, he was loaned to fellow top-flight club CD Leganés for one year. He made 30 appearances as the side from the outskirts of Madrid avoided relegation, and scored a last-minute equaliser in a 2–2 draw at Deportivo Alavés on 21 January 2018. On 7 May, he was sent off in a 3–0 home loss to Levante UD for denying José Luis Morales a goalscoring opportunity.

Zaldúa scored his first goal for Real Sociedad on 12 May 2019 in a 3–1 victory over Real Madrid at Anoeta Stadium, but was replaced in the same game with a broken left leg.

Cádiz
On 11 July 2022, Zaldúa joined Cádiz CF on a three-year contract.

Career statistics

Club

Honours
Real Sociedad
Copa del Rey: 2019–20

References

External links
Real Sociedad official profile 

1992 births
Living people
Spanish footballers
Footballers from San Sebastián
Association football defenders
La Liga players
Segunda División B players
Real Sociedad B footballers
Real Sociedad footballers
CD Leganés players
Cádiz CF players
Basque Country international footballers